Bob Cupp (December 27, 1939 – August 19, 2016) was an American golf course designer. He designed many golf courses worldwide and was the president of the American Society of Golf Course Architects in 2012–13.

Early life
Cupp was born on December 27, 1939, in Lewistown, Pennsylvania. He graduated from the University of Miami with a bachelor of arts degree, and he earned a master of Fine Arts degree from the University of Alaska, followed by an associate degree in golf turf management at Miami Dade College.

Career
Cupp designed many golf courses around the world. Among them are the Shoal Creek Club in Alabama, Desert Highlands Golf Club in Arizona, and the Glen Abbey Golf Course in Ontario, Canada.

Cupp helped design courses for Jack Nicklaus from 1976 to 1982. He also designed the Old Waverly Golf Club in West Point, Mississippi, with Jerry Pate, the Savannah Quarters Country Club in Pooler, Georgia, with Greg Norman, and the Witch Hollow Golf Course at the Pumpkin Ridge Golf Club in North Plains, Oregon, with John Fought. With Tom Kite, Cupp designed the Liberty National Golf Club in Jersey City, New Jersey, and the 36-hole Legends Club in Franklin, Tennessee.

Cupp served as the president of the American Society of Golf Course Architects in 2012–13. He authored a novel about golf in 2007 and co-authored a non-fiction book about golf with Ron Whitten in 2012.

Personal life and death
Cupp married Pamela Amy-Cupp. They had children, and they resided in Buckhead.

Cupp died on August 19, 2016, in Atlanta.

Works

Golf Courses (Original Design)
 Angel Park (Short Course), Las Vegas, Nevada
 Beacon Hall, Aurora, Ontario, Canada
 Big Sky Golf and Country Club, Pemberton, British Columbia
 Bradford Creek Golf Club, Greeneville, North Carolina
 Costa del Sol, Miami, Florida
 Cheeca Lodge, Islamorada, Florida
 Council Fire Country Club, Chattanooga, Tennessee
 Crosswater Golf Course, Sunriver, Oregon
 Cumming’s Cove Club, Hendersonville, North Carolina
 Deerhurst Inn and Country Club, Ontario, Canada
 Eagle Ridge Golf Club, Raleigh, North Carolina
 East Sussex National (East), London, England
 East Sussex National (West), London, England
 Emerald Bay Plantation, Destin, Florida
 Estancia de Cafayate, Salta Province, Argentina
 Estuary at Grey Oaks, Naples, Florida
 Four Bridges, Cincinnati, Ohio
 Frenchman’s Creek (South), West Palm Beach, Florida
 Frenchman’s Creek (North), West Palm Beach, Florida
 Grasslands at Oakbridge, Lakeland, Florida
 Greystone Country Club, Birmingham, Alabama
 Grizzly Ranch, Portola, California
 Hawk’s Ridge, Ball Ground, Georgia
 Homestead Air Force Base, Homestead, Florida
 Indianwood (New), Lake Orion, Michigan
 Jennings Mill Country Club, Athens, Georgia
 John Kyle State Park, Saris, Mississippi
 Kelly Plantation, Destin, Florida
 Kiokawa Golf Club, Kiyokawa, Japan
 La Playa Resort, Naples, Florida
 Laurel Ridge Country Club, Waynesville, North Carolina
 Legends Club of Tennessee North Course, Franklin, TN
 Legends Club of Tennessee South Course, Franklin, TN
 Langdon Farms, Clackamas County, Oregon
 Liberty National Golf Club, Jersey City, New Jersey
 Little Course at Aspen Grove, Franklin, Tennessee
 Mad River Golf Club, Nottawasaga, Ontario, Canada
 Marietta Country Club, Kennesaw, Georgia
 Mountain Spa Resort, Las Vegas, Nevada
 Newcastle (Coal Creek), Newcastle, Washington
 Newcastle (China Creek), Newcastle, Washington
 Old Waverly Golf Club, Jackson, Mississippi
 Pumpkin Ridge (Ghost Creek), Cornelius, Oregon
 Pumpkin Ridge (Witch Hollow), Cornelius, Oregon
 Port Armor Golf Club, Greensboro, Georgia
 Pelham Municipal, Pelham, Alabama
 Palmetto Hall Plantation, Hilton Head Island, South Carolina
 Rarity Pointe, Knoxville, Tennessee
 Reunion Golf Club, Jackson, Mississippi
 Reynold’s Plantation, Greensboro, Georgia
 Royal Kenfield, Henderson, Nevada
 Rush Creek Golf Club, Minneapolis, Minnesota
 Savannah Harbor, Savannah, Georgia
 Settindown Creek, Roswell, Georgia
 Shadow Wood (East), Bonita Springs, Florida
 Shadow Wood (West), Bonita Springs, Florida
 Sonnenalp (Singletree), Edwards, Colorado
 Spanish Hills, Camarillo, California
 Stowe Mountain Resort, Stowe, Vermont
 Tatum Ranch, Phoenix, Arizona
 Tierra Rejada Golf Club, Simi Valley, California
 The Reserve North Course, Hillsboro, Oregon
 Thousand Hills Golf Club, Branson, Missouri
 TPC at Starr Pass, Tucson, Arizona
 Walden Lake Country Club, Plant City, Florida
 Water’s Edge Par Three, San Francisco, California
 Woodside Plantation, Aiken, South Carolina

Golf Courses - Rebuild
 Alamance Country Club, Burlington, North Carolina
 Augusta Country Club, Augusta, Georgia
 Baltimore Country Club West, Baltimore, Maryland
 Bobby Jones Golf Course, Atlanta, Georgia
 Capital City Club Brookhaven, Atlanta, Georgia
 Druid Hills Golf Club, Atlanta, Georgia
 Frenchman’s Creek South, West Palm Beach, Florida
 Forest Height’s Country Club, Statesboro, Georgia
 Fiddlesticks Country Club, Ft. Myers, Florida
 Feathersound Country Club, Clearwater, Florida
 Grand Geneva Resort and Spa, Lake Geneva, Wisconsin
 Highland Park Country Club, Birmingham, Alabama
 Hawk’s Landing Golf Club, Orlando, Florida
 John A White Park, Atlanta, Georgia
 Moon Valley Country Club, Phoenix, Arizona
 North River Yacht & Country Club, Tuscaloosa, Alabama
 Oak Ridge Golf Club, Oak Ridge, Tennessee
 Pecan Valley  Golf Club, San Antonio, Texas
 Swan Point, Charles County, Maryland
 The Greenbrier (Meadows), White Sulphur Springs, WV
 The Rookery, Marco Island, Florida
 University or Oklahoma Golf Club, Norman, Oklahoma
 Vinny Links at Shelby Park, Franklin, TN
 Woodfield Country Club, Boca Raton, Florida

Golf Courses - Renovation
 Atlanta Country Club, Marietta, Georgia        
 Augusta National Golf Club, Augusta Georgia
 Bluegrass Yacht & Country Club, Bluegrass, Tennessee
 Brook-Lea Country Club, Rochester, New York
 Bryn Mawr Country Club, Chicago, Illinois
 Cartersville Country Club, Cartersville, Georgia
 Clarksville Country Club, Clarksville, Tennessee
 Colonial Country Club, Ft. Worth, Texas
 Columbia Edgewater Country Club, Greenville, South Carolina
 Evanston Golf Club, Skokie, Illinois
 Emerald Bay Plantation, Destin, Florida
 Gaston Country Club, Gastonia, North Carolina
 Gatlinburg Country Club, Gatlinburg, Tennessee
 Hillendale Country Club, Baltimore, Maryland
 Indianwood Old Course, Lake Orion, Michigan
 Indian Hills Country Club, Bowling Green, Kentucky
 Indian Hills Country Club, Marietta, Georgia
 Lago Mar Country Club, Plantation, Florida
 Marrietta Country Club, Kennesaw, Georgia
 Nassau Country Club, Glen Cove, New York
 Olde Town Club, Winston-Salem, North Carolina
 Palm River Golf Club, Naples, Florida
 Peachtree Golf Club, Atlanta, Georgia
 Preston Trail Golf Club, Dallas, Texas
 Rosedale Country Club, Toronto, Canada
 Santa Barbara Golf Club, Santa Barbara, CA
 Summit Golf and Country Club, Richmond Hill, Ontario, Canada
 Tualatin Country Club, Tualatin, Oregon
 The Country Club, Farmington, Connecticut
 The Golf Club of Avon, Avon, Connecticut
 The Palm Course at Grey Oaks, Naples, Florida
 Wanakah Country Club, Hamburg, New York
 Woodmont Country Club, Rockdale, Maryland
 Weston Golf Club, Weston,  Massachusetts

Golf Courses - Restoration
 Leatherstocking Country Club, Cooperstown, New York
 Oakhurst Links, White Sulphur Springs, West Virginia
 Seaview Resort(Bay), Absecon, New Jersey
 Seaview Resort(Pines), Absecon, New Jersey

Golf Courses (Closed/No Longer Exist - NLE)
 Glen Arven Country Club, Thomasville, Georgia
 Hidden Valley (defunct), Miami, Florida
 Ironwood Golf Club (defunct), Naples, Florida
 The Woodyard (defunct), Savannah, Georgia

References

1939 births
2016 deaths
People from Lewistown, Pennsylvania
People from Atlanta
University of Miami alumni
University of Alaska alumni
Golf clubs and courses designed by Robert E. Cupp
American male novelists
21st-century American novelists
American sportswriters
21st-century American male writers